Men's artistic gymnastics events were held at the 1951 Pan American Games in Buenos Aires, Argentina.


Medal table

Medalists

Artistic gymnastics

Men's events

See also
Pan American Gymnastics Championships
South American Gymnastics Championships
Gymnastics at the 1952 Summer Olympics

References 

1951
Gymnastics
Pan American Games
1951 Pan American Games